Daneshjoo Park (formerly Pahlavi park before Iranian Revolution) is an urban park in Enghelab Street, Tehran. It is located between Vali Asr intersection and in neighboring of  Tehran city Theater complex. It is bounded by Valiasr Street from the west, Razi Street from the east and Enghelab Street from the north.

It is located in the ground of approximately 3200 square meters, and consists of  Tehran City Theatre hall, Daneshjoo library, play grounds, buffet and rest rooms.
In recent years, Tehran municipality has built Teatr-e Shahr Metro Station in the northwest corner and Vali Asr cultural complex in the southwest corner of the park.

It was built in 1978, and is one of oldest memorable parks that was constructed in an area as wide as 32,000 square meters in 1967.

References

Parks in Tehran